An amorph is a mutated allele that has lost the ability of the parent allele (whether wild type or any other type) to encode any functional protein. An amorph mutation, or null, is the loss of genetic information for the synthesis of appropriate mRNA. Depending on the relationships of the parent allele, an amorphous mutant can have various forms of gene interactions.

The term "amorph" was used by Hermann Joseph Muller in 1932.

See also
 Allele
 Gene mutation
 Muller's morphs

References

Classical genetics